Raymond Rivoire (21 October 1884 – 27 September 1966) was a French sculptor. His work was part of the art competitions at the 1924 Summer Olympics and the 1928 Summer Olympics.

References

1884 births
1966 deaths
19th-century French sculptors
20th-century French sculptors
French male sculptors
Olympic competitors in art competitions
People from Cusset
19th-century French male artists